Denny Seiwell (born July 10, 1943) is an American drummer and a founding member of Wings. He also drummed for Billy Joel and Liza Minnelli and played in the scores for the films  Waterworld, Grease II, and Vertical Limit. His drumming was used in TV shows such as Happy Days and Knots Landing.

Biography
Seiwell was born and raised in Lehighton, Pennsylvania, the son of Donald Seiwell and Fay Carrigan. He is a graduate of Lehighton High School and was a member of the first Carbon County Band in 1961. After graduating from high school, Seiwell enlisted in the United States Navy, in the rate of Musician, playing in the Navy Band. He moved to New York City and caught the eye of Paul McCartney, who recruited him to be in his band Wings and according to Seiwell, the band was like one big family living between London and the McCartneys' farm in Scotland. After leaving the band, Seiwell eventually moved to Los Angeles, where he has resided since 1975. Seiwell stated in 2019 that he and McCartney have kept in touch since 1993.

In 2021, Seiwell produced Ram On – The 50th Anniversary Tribute to Paul and Linda McCartney's Ram with Fernando Perdomo.

Discography

Paul and Linda McCartney 
 1971: Ram (Capitol)

Paul McCartney and Wings 
 Studio albums
 1971: Wild Life (Apple/EMI)
 1973: Red Rose Speedway (Apple/EMI)

 Singles
These are singles that have not appeared on any official album except on compilations.
 1971: Give Ireland Back to the Irish
 1972: C Moon
 1972: Mary Had a Little Lamb
 1972: Hi, Hi, Hi

 Compilations
 1978: Wings Greatest (EMI)
 1987: All the Best! - Performs on C Moon, Another Day, Live and Let Die and Uncle Albert/Admiral Halsey.
 2001: Wingspan (EMI)
 2016: Pure McCartney - Performs on Heart of the Country, Dear Boy, Uncle Albert/Admiral Halsey, Too Many People and The Back Seat of My Car.

 Soundtrack
 Live and Let Die - Plays on the title track.
 Single
 1973: Live and Let Die (Apple/EMI) - Single

Various 
 1969: Kai Winding/JJ Johnson – Betwixt and Between (A&M Records)
 1970: John Denver – Take Me to Tomorrow (RCA)
 1971: Astrud Gilberto – Gilberto with Turrentine (CTI)
 1971: Billy Joel – Cold Spring Harbor (Columbia)
 1973: Donovan – Essence to Essence (Epic)
 1975: Keith Godchaux and Donna Godchaux – Keith & Donna (Round)
 1975: Art Garfunkel – Breakaway (Columbia)
 1977: Rick Danko – Rick Danko (Arista)
 1977: Liza Minnelli – Tropical Nights (Columbia)
 1982: Janis Joplin – Farewell Song (Columbia) - Posthumous compilation
 1984: Deniece Williams – I'm So Proud (Columbia)

Production 
 2021: Ram On - The 50th Anniversary Tribute to Paul and Linda McCartney's Ram - With Fernando Perdomo

References

External links 
Denny Seiwell's web site
Denny Seiwell Interview - NAMM Oral History Library (2016)

Paul McCartney and Wings members
People from Lehighton, Pennsylvania
Living people
1943 births
American rock drummers
American session musicians
American expatriates in the United Kingdom
20th-century American drummers
American male drummers
World Classic Rockers members